"Kings Never Die" is a song by American rapper Eminem, from the soundtrack album Southpaw (Music from and Inspired By the Motion Picture), released on July 10, 2015. It features American singer Gwen Stefani, marking there first collaboration together. The song is the second single released from the soundtrack, after Eminem's "Phenomenal" which was released a month earlier. "Kings Never Die" also marks Stefani's first featured single since 2005's "Can I Have It Like That" with Pharrell Williams. The song was co-written and produced by the New Royales.

Background and release
Shady Records and Eminem were approached by Kurt Sutter and asked to executively produce a soundtrack for the 2015 film, Southpaw. Eminem has four songs on the soundtrack, including two from his collaborative effort – Bad Meets Evil. The other single from the soundtrack, "Phenomenal", is also from Eminem. The song was officially released on July 10, when the audio track was uploaded to YouTube. On July 29, the lyric video was uploaded to YouTube. This song talks about him (Eminem) being a king of rap and many people urging him to retire. Eminem says that he won't retire and will stay a king.

Critical reception
On July 3, 2015, the full song leaked onto the internet, followed by a positive response from critics. Lars Brandle from Billboard Magazine stated that the song "is a muscular effort with a classic angry vibe, [but] it's hardly a knockout [and] absolutely worth a spin." Rap-Up Magazine thought that the song was a "triumphant rap-rock hybrid with rapid-fire rhymes.

Commercial performance
"Kings Never Die" was the highest-ranking debut for the Billboard Hot 100 chart dated August 1, 2015, entering the chart at number 80. Its chart debut was supported by first-week digital download sales of 35,000 copies, along with 1.2 million domestic streams.

Track listing
Digital download

Notes
 signifies an additional producer.

Charts

Certifications

References

2015 singles
2015 songs
Eminem songs
Gwen Stefani songs
Rap rock songs
Songs written by Eminem
Songs written by DJ Khalil
Songs written by Luis Resto (musician)
Songs written by Erik Alcock
Songs written for films
Song recordings produced by DJ Khalil
Aftermath Entertainment singles
Interscope Records singles
Shady Records singles